Dritan (also spelled Driton) is an Albanian masculine given name, which is derived from the Albanian word dritë, meaning "light". The name may refer to:

Dritan Abazović (born 1985), Albanian-Montenegrin politician
Dritan Babamusta (born 1981), Albanian football player
Dritan Baholli (born 1974), Albanian football player and coach
Dritan Dajti (born 1981), Albanian criminal
Dritan Hoxha (1968–2008), Albanian businessman
Dritan Mehmeti (born 1980), Albanian football player
Dritan Resuli (born 1976), Albanian football manager
Dritan Smajli (born 1985), Albanian football player
Dritan Stafsula (born 1981), Albanian football player
Driton Camaj (born 1997), Albanian-Montenegrin football player
Driton Dovolani (born 1973), Albanian-American dancer
Driton Selmanaj (born 1979), Kosovo-Albanian politician

References

Given names
Albanian masculine given names
Masculine given names